Maringma-tepui, also written Mount Maringma and historically known as Mount Marima, is a small tepui of the Pacaraima Mountains in Cuyuni-Mazaruni, Guyana. It is known as Malaima-tepui in the local Akawaio language. However, the mountain remains the subject of considerable toponymic confusion and its name has been applied to at least one other nearby peak.

The village of Wayalayeng lies at the base of Maringma-tepui and it is from here that the mountain was explored in May–July 2004 by a botanical team of the Smithsonian Institution. Led by David Clarke, this was the first expedition to reach the mountain's summit. It was followed by two further expeditions in February 2006 and late 2007, by Bruce Means and Philippe J. R. Kok et al., respectively.

It is predominantly covered in low-growing "tepui meadow" vegetation, quaking peat bog, and some dwarf forests of Bonnetia roraimae, with few areas of exposed rock. The dominant plant families include Bonnetiaceae, Bromeliaceae, Clusiaceae, Orchidaceae, Rapateaceae, Sarraceniaceae, and Xyridaceae. Temperatures vary widely on the summit plateau, with extremes of 13.5 and 37.5 °C recorded over a five-day period.

Native herpetofauna include the lizard species Arthrosaura hoogmoedi  and Pantepuisaurus rodriguesi (Gymnophthalmidae), as well as the frog species Adelophryne patamona (Eleutherodactylidae); Anomaloglossus kaiei, Anomaloglossus megacephalus, and Anomaloglossus praderioi (Aromobatidae); and Oreophrynella macconnelli and Oreophrynella seegobini (Bufonidae).


See also
 Distribution of Heliamphora

Notes

a.The maps provided in Sarraceniaceae of South America place Maringma-tepui on the Brazil–Venezuela border, some distance southeast of Roraima-tepui. The book's authors also state that Maringma-tepui was incorrectly called "Mount Yakontipu" by Fleischmann et al. (2007) in their description of Drosera solaris.

References

Further reading

 Strong, M.T. (17 January 2006). Taxonomy and distribution of Rhynchospora (Cyperaceae) in the Guianas, South America. Contributions from the United States National Herbarium 53: 1–225.

External links
 Another new lizard genus!

Tepuis of Guyana
Mountains of Guyana